Minguzzi is an Italian surname. Notable people with the surname include:
Andrea Minguzzi (born 1982), Italian Greco-Roman wrestler
Anna Minguzzi (born circa 1973), Italian physicist

Italian-language surnames